FK Kamenica Sasa is a football club from Makedonska Kamenica, North Macedonia. They are currently competing in the Macedonian Second League.

History
The club was founded in 1968. Their most successful year was when they won the Macedonian championship in 1992.

Honours
 Macedonian Republic League:
Winners: 1991–92

Current squad
As of 23 February 2023.

External links
Official website  
Sasa Facebook 
Club info at MacedonianFootball 
Football Federation of Macedonia 

Sasa
Association football clubs established in 1968
1968 establishments in the Socialist Republic of Macedonia
FK
Sasa